JDN can refer to:
 Julian Day Number
 Joint Data Network
Jewish Daily News, an international Jewish news aggregator